Rajesh Gopakumar (born 1967 in Kolkata, India) is a theoretical physicist and the director of the International Centre for Theoretical Sciences (ICTS-TIFR) in Bangalore, India. He was previously a professor at Harish-Chandra Research Institute (HRI) in Prayagraj, India. He is known for his work on topological string theory.

Background
Gopakumar was born in 1967 to Jaishree and G. Gopakumar in Kolkata. His family hails from the southern Indian state of Kerala. He has the distinction of being ranked 1 in the entrance examination for IIT in 1987.

Gopakumar obtained his integrated M.Sc. degree in physics from the IIT Kanpur in 1992. He completed his Ph.D. from Princeton University in 1997 under the supervision of David Gross. After a few years as a research associate at Harvard University, he joined HRI in 2001. He was also a visiting fellow at the Institute for Advanced Study, Princeton, New Jersey from 2001 to 2004.

He is married to Rukmini Dey, a Professor of Mathematical Physics and Geometry at ICTS-TIFR.

Research
Gopakumar is a string theorist. Early in his career, his research was primarily focused on large N gauge theories with David Gross, noncommutative gauge theories with Andrew Strominger and Shiraz Minwalla, and topological string theory and gauge/geometry correspondence with Cumrun Vafa and is particularly known for proposing the Gopakumar–Vafa duality and Gopakumar–Vafa invariants. Later, his work focussed on attempts to derive the AdS/CFT correspondence, and on minimal model holography (with Matthias Gaberdiel). In recent years, he has made important contributions to higher spin theories and their connections with string theory (with Matthias Gaberdiel). He has also recently worked on the Conformal bootstrap.

Awards
Gopakumar was awarded the 2004 B.M. Birla Science Prize in Physics.

He received the 2006 ICTP Prize.

He received the Shanti Swarup Bhatnagar Award in 2009.

He was named Fellow of the Global Young Academy of Scientists for 2010. He is a member of the Indian National Science Academy, and the Indian Academy of Sciences.

He received TWAS Prize in Physics in 2013.

Selected publications

List of R. Gopakumar's Publications

References

1967 births
Living people
20th-century Indian physicists
Indian string theorists
Recipients of the Shanti Swarup Bhatnagar Award in Physical Science
IIT Kanpur alumni
Scientists from Kolkata
TWAS laureates